Camille Mana  is an American actress.

Career
Camille Mana originated the title role in the World Premiere of Asuncion, a play written by Jesse Eisenberg. She starred opposite Eisenberg and Justin Bartha at The Cherry Lane Theatre in New York. She played the role of Amanda in the West Coast Premiere of 4000 Miles at the American Conservatory Theater.

She will portray Ruby, sister to Mel Bayani (Liza Lapira) on CBS season two of The Equalizer. Mana appears in Lionsgate feature film Scrambled, starring Yvonne Strahovski and June Diane Raphael set to premiere at 2023 South by Southwest festival. She co-stars in Netflix animated feature film as Jing, love interest to Geraldo (Patrick Warburton) in Seal Team opposite JK Simmons, Matthew Rhys, and Kristen Schaal. 

Mana appeared in the Miramax Films dramedy Smart People playing Missy Chin which premiered at Sundance and co-starred in the MGM teen comedy film College. She got her first major role as Lisa on the sitcom One on One starring Kyla Pratt during the fifth and final season. She can be seen in feature films including Cake, Norman, High School, All I Want, and Speed-Dating. She portrayed Rose Castillo, a victim of an Asian-American hate crime on NBC drama New Amsterdam. 

She produced a short film, Equal Opportunity starring Aldis Hodge, Alanna Ubach, and Tom Lenk, which won NBC's First Annual Comedy Shortcuts Festival and Official Selection at SXSW, Montreal Just For Laughs Festival, and dozens more.  She co-produced the dramatic feature film The Things We Carry, and produced the short film Carnal Orient which debuted at the Slamdance Film Festival.

Personal life
Camille was raised in Orange County, California. She attended the University of California, Berkeley. Mana resides in Los Angeles and Brooklyn.

Filmography
The Equalizer (2023) - Ruby
Scrambled (2023) - Jen
Captain Tsunami's Army (2022) - Dr. White
Seal Team (2021) - Jing
New Amsterdam (2021) - Rose Castillo
Woke (2020) - Voice (uncredited)
MacGyver (2020) - HannaGrow the F* Up (2018) - Vicki
 The Rough Part (2018) - Diana
 Girl On the Side (2018) - Lisa
 Five Star Fouad (2017) - Janey
 This Isn't Working (2016) - Leslie
 All I Want (2016) - Cami
 Carnal Orient (2016) - Producer
 Oh Em Gee (2016) - God
 Cake (2015) - Nurse Salazar
 Bones (2014) - Actress (Voice)
 Chosen (TV Series) (2013) - Jennifer
 Josh Moore Show (2013) - Tessa
 High School (2010) - Dana
 Norman (2010) - Helen Black
 Speed-Dating (2010) - Kiki
 The Things We Carry (2009) - Co-Producer
 Why Men Go Gay in LA (2009) - Actress
 Why Am I Doing This? (2009) - Nicky
 The Samurai of Strongsville, Ohio (2009) - Suki Hosukawa
 College (2008) - Heather
 Smart People (2008) - Missy Chin
 Equal Opportunity (2007) - Producer, Grace Ching Chong
 The Good Ol' Boys (2007) - Producer
 One on One (2005–2006) - Lisa Sanchez
 Johnny Benson's Adventures in the Blogosphere (2005) - Allison
 Harlequin (2004) - Peggy Lin
 The O.C. (2003) - Underclassman P.A.
 Angel'' (2001) - Les

References

External links
 Official Website
 
 Camille Mana in FHM

21st-century American actresses
American film actresses
American television actresses
Living people
Year of birth missing (living people)